The Fordson WOT (from War Office 'type' or 'truck') was a military truck produced by Ford of Britain in the Second World War. From 1939 to 1945, around 130,000 units were produced at the Ford Dagenham plant with almost half being the WOT2.

Five models, WOT1, WOT2, WOT3, WOT6 and WOT8 were produced. The WOT1, 2 and 3 were rear-wheel drive and had the cab behind the engine; WOT6 and 8 were all-wheel drive with a cab over the engine. The same engine was used across the range - 3.6L Ford sidevalve V-8 petrol engine delivering 85 hp at 3,800 rpm. The transmission was a four-speed manual with an additional reduction gearbox for the four wheel drive models.

Models
 

WOT1
6x4,   
WOT1A was a  wheelbase version. 
WOT1 and 1A was mostly used by RAF eg as Fire Tenders
WOT2
4x2, 15-cwt
WOT3
4x2, 30-cwt. used by RAF
WOT8
4x4, 30-cwt. Used as artillery tractor in North Africa campaign. Supplied to USSR where it was used for Katyusha rocket launchers
WOT6
4x4, 60-cwt. longer wheelbase version of WOT8

Notes

References

External links

Ford WOT6
WOT8 

Military trucks of the United Kingdom
World War II vehicles of the United Kingdom
Soft-skinned vehicles
Ford of Europe vehicles